Erasure is a 2001 novel by American writer Percival Everett and originally published by UPNE. The novel reacts against the dominant strains of discussion surrounding the publication and criticism of African-American literature.

Plot

Erasure is about a writer dealing with death, murder, and growing old. The novel's plot revolves around many things, but is essentially about the consequences of turning one's art into a simple commodity; i.e. giving into market forces. The market force within Erasure mirrors the late-1990s reality of how the publishing industry pigeon-holed Black writers, and centered or valued certain experiences [those of the urban poor] over others. Themes around race, class, loyalty to family, sex, the theory of language, the life of canonical western artists, abortion, and sexual identity are also explored as the novel unfolds.

The protagonist, Thelonious "Monk" Ellison, a professor of English literature, is in a rut with his own writing. His agent repeatedly explains to him that publishing houses don't believe his writing to be "black enough". To make matters worse, Ellison experiences this angst, as another book called We's Lives In Da Ghetto by Juanita Mae Jenkins is becoming a national best seller and critical darling. Monk is angered by the success of Jenkins' book, so he composes a satirical response based on Richard Wright's Native Son (1940) and Sapphire's novel Push (1996), which he first entitles My Pafology before changing it to Fuck.  This novel is published in its entirety within Erasure and creates a meta-narrative that asks the reader about the value and merits of such writing in contrast to the supposedly more erudite text of Erasure.

Structure
Like many of Everett novels, Erasure is experimental in structure. Part of the novel's structure involves the multiple embedded narratives, written by the main character Thelonious "Monk" Ellison, including his mock-novel titled My Pafology.  The Guardian review described it as a "skilful, extended parody of ghetto novels such as Sapphire's Push." The novel includes other narrative styles within the larger narrative frame, including an academic paper, personal letters, story ideas, imagined dialogue between fictionalized historical characters, and, in the final section, the end of Erasure as written by Stagg R Leigh, Monk's alter ego.

Criticism
The novel was well received. Darryl Pinckney's review in The Guardian focused on the dark comedy that Erasure represents, describing it as moving towards "bleakest comedy" and "sly work." Ready Steady Book focused more on the novel being "full of anger" about the African American literary establishment, but describes the most redeeming elements of the plot coming from a "moving portrait of a son coming to terms with his mother's life."

References

Further reading

2001 American novels
African-American novels
Novels about writers
University Press of New England books